Yu Weiguo (born October 1955) is a Chinese politician who served as Communist Party Secretary of Fujian. Prior to that he served as Deputy Communist Party Secretary and Governor of Fujian, and Communist Party Secretary of Xiamen.

Biography
Yu was born in Wendeng, Shandong Province. Yu entered the work force as a chemical factory worker in Taicang, Jiangsu Province. He joined the Chinese Communist Party in October 1975. In 1979, shortly after the resumption of the National College Entrance Examination, Yu was admitted to the Chinese language department of Renmin University.

In 1983, he began working for the Secretariat of the Chinese Communist Party, then he began research on Deng Xiaoping theory. Starting in 1991 he served as a political staffer to Wang Zhen and Ding Guangen. In 1995 he was made Assistant to the Mayor of Xiamen, then in 2002 he was named deputy party secretary of Xiamen, and head of the Organization Department of Xiamen. In 2005, Yu was made deputy head, then head of the Organization Department of Fujian, and a member of the provincial Party Standing Committee; in 2009, he was named party secretary of Xiamen. He was known to be proactive in engaging the concerns of residents on the internet. As a direct result of online discussions, Yu was able to tackle a transit fare problem faced by city residents.  In Xiamen, he worked with He Lifeng and Liu Cigui, both of whom were considered "political stars" who were later promoted.  In April 2013, he was named deputy party secretary of Fujian.

In November 2015, Yu became the acting governor of Fujian; he became the oldest person to assume the post of Fujian Governor in some three decades, taking the office at the age of 60, which was the mandatory retirement age of sub-provincial level officials. This meant, effectively, that his 'political life' would be extended a further five years. In October 2017, he was appointed as the party secretary of Fujian.

In December 2020, Yu was appointed as the Deputy Chairperson of the National People's Congress Environment Protection and Resources Conservation Committee.

Yu is an alternate member of the 18th Central Committee of the Chinese Communist Party and a full member of the 19th Central Committee.

References

External links
于伟国简历

1955 births
Renmin University of China alumni
Living people
Politicians from Weihai
Governors of Fujian
People's Republic of China politicians from Shandong
Chinese Communist Party politicians from Shandong
Alternate members of the 18th Central Committee of the Chinese Communist Party
Members of the 19th Central Committee of the Chinese Communist Party
Delegates to the 13th National People's Congress
Delegates to the 12th National People's Congress